Marc Abraham is an American film producer, director, and former president of Strike Entertainment, a production company he launched in early 2002 with a multi-year, first look arrangement with Universal Pictures.

Career

Abraham began his career as a copywriter for Young & Rubicam in New York City after graduating from the University of Virginia. He left advertising to pursue a full-time writing career and worked as a freelance sportswriter for several newspapers and magazines. He also wrote two books on the International Olympic Games for Universal Press.

Abraham's entry into film began with the documentary, Playing to Win, an inside look at the Cuban athletic system. He wrote several screenplays for studios and networks including 20th Century Fox, Warner Bros. and CBS. He also wrote for the popular series 21 Jump Street and Moonlighting.

He was a founding partner, along with Armyan Bernstein, at Beacon Communications, a financing and production company founded in 1990. 

Abraham brought to the big screen Flash of Genius, released by Universal Pictures in Fall 2008, which marked his directorial debut and stars Greg Kinnear and Lauren Graham. Based on a true story, the movie tells the story of a small-time inventor who takes on the Detroit automakers. Also for Universal Pictures, Abraham is producing Trouble is My Business, an adaptation of Raymond Chandler's detective-noir classic, starring Clive Owen. He produced the remake of The Thing for Strike Entertainment alongside Eric Newman.

Even with the disestablishment of Strike Entertainment in 2013, Abraham and Newman still produced the 2014 film RoboCop under the Strike Entertainment name since it started production in 2012.

Abraham directed, wrote and produced the 2015 Hank Williams biopic I Saw the Light, which starred Tom Hiddleston. It was based on Colin Escott's 1994 book Hank Williams: The Biography.

Beacon Pictures 

During its first few years, Beacon Communications produced award-winning films like The Commitments which was nominated for a Golden Globe Award for Best Motion Picture – Musical or Comedy in 1992 and also went on to win four BAFTA awards; and Keith Gordon's A Midnight Clear, starring Ethan Hawke. 

In a co-venture with Turner Pictures, Abraham executive produced David Mamet's A Life in the Theatre. Beacon also produced Sugar Hill, starring Wesley Snipes; Princess Caraboo, starring Phoebe Cates and Kevin Kline; The Road to Wellville, directed by Alan Parker and starring Anthony Hopkins; and The Baby-Sitters Club, based on the best-selling series of books from Scholastic.

Strike Entertainment

Abraham and fellow producers Thomas Bliss and Eric Newman founded Strike Entertainment in 2002. They produced such films as Children of Men, The Rundown (2003), Slither (2006), Flash of Genius (2008), The Thing (2011), and RoboCop (2014) under Strike's production name.

In March 2013, Abraham, Bliss and Newman dissolved Strike Entertainment after 11 years as a Universal-based production company. The Universal first-look deal dissolved the company is Spring 2013, which marked the end of a 15-year tenure at the studio for Abraham, Bliss and Newman. Abraham and Newman said the partnership simply ran its course and that the parting is amicable. They will continue to work together on a projects they still have percolating under the Strike banner.

Awards and affiliations 
Abraham is a member of the Writer's Guild, the Producer's Guild, and on the board of the Virginia Film Festival and the Violence Policy Center. He has been honored with the Spirit of Chrysalis Award, which recognized Abraham for his outstanding commitment to helping change lives through jobs, and helping thousands of disadvantaged and homeless individuals and families in Los Angeles.

Filmography 
He was a producer in all films unless otherwise noted.

Film

As writer

As director

As an actor

Soundtrack

Television

As writer

References

External links 
 

American film producers
Living people
American film directors
Year of birth missing (living people)